Events in the year 2016 in Tanzania.

Incumbents
 President: John Magufuli
 Vice-President: Samia Suluhu 
 Prime Minister: Kassim Majaliwa 
 Chief Justice: Mohamed Chande Othman

Events
10 September – A magnitude 5.9 earthquake killed 19 people and injured 253 in Tanzania.

Sport
5-21 August – Tanzania at the 2016 Summer Olympics: 7 competitors in 3 sports

Deaths

4 March – Joseph Rwegasira politician and diplomat (b. 1935).

13 April – Matthias Joseph Isuja, Roman Catholic bishop (b. 1929).

14 August – Aboud Jumbe, politician (b. 1920)

7 November – Samuel Sitta, politician (b. 1942)

References

 
2010s in Tanzania
Years of the 21st century in Tanzania
Tanzania
Tanzania